Umar Ganj (formally known as Nariyaon Urf Umar Ganj) is a village in Zamania tehsil of Ghazipur District, Uttar Pradesh, India. As of the 2011 Census Umar Ganj has a total population of 7816 and a geographical area of 536.56 hectares. The land were the Umar Ganj urf Nariyaon stood belonged to the Kamsaar Pathans family of Kusi. Later in 1680s many Kamsar Pathans from Kusi and near by relative village settled here and established the village of Umar Ganj. Later in 1750s many Hindu families also came and established the village of Nariyaon on that land.

References

Villages in Ghazipur district